Andres Taimla (born 23 August 1947 Kuressaare - died 3 January 2022 Kadrina) was an Estonian politician. He was a member of 
VII, VIII and IX Riigikogu.

References

1947 births
Living people
People from Kuressaare
Estonian Reform Party politicians
Members of the Riigikogu, 1995–1999
Members of the Riigikogu, 1999–2003
Members of the Riigikogu, 2003–2007